Erik Madsen may refer to:

 Erik Madsen (boxer), Danish boxer
 Erik Madsen (chess player), Norwegian chess player

See also
 Eric Madsen, American college baseball coach